Native headmen system was an integral part of the administration of the island of Ceylon (now known as Sri Lanka) under the successive European colonial powers, namely the Portuguese Empire, the Dutch East India Company and the British Empire. Native headmen or leaders were appointed by the European colonial administrators to function as intermediates between the Europeans and the native populous. During different periods through this system these headmen functioned in military, policing, administrative and ceremonial capacities. They served as translators, revenue collectors and wielded quasi-judicial powers. Much of the system evolved and changed over time until some of the last vestiges of it were removed in the post-independent Ceylon.

History

Origins
Native headmen system was an integral part of the administration of the island of Ceylon (now known as Sri Lanka) under the successive European colonial powers, namely the Portuguese Empire, the Dutch East India Company and the British Empire. Native headmen or leaders were appointed by the European colonial administrators to function as intermediates between the Europeans and the native populous. During different periods through this system these headmen functioned in military, policing, administrative and ceremonial capacities. They served as translators, revenue collectors and wielded quasi-judicial powers. Much of the system evolved and changed over time until some of the last vestiges of it were removed in the post-independent Ceylon.

British period
With the on set of British rule, Governor North restructured the native headmen system. The system was transformed into a salaried system with land grants and tenured service abolished. They became the second tier of the civil administration of the island with appointments made by the Governor. Over the next century, the headmen grew to be a powerful and affluent class consolidating economic power through land ownership and marriage. Gradually functions of headmen were transferred to various departments that were established by the British administration.

Every district is subdivided into Pattus or Korales. These Pattus are divided into villages, hamlets, etc. Pattus are presided over by Mudaliyars and Muhandirams in low country districts, Ratemahattayas and Korales in the Kandyan provinces, Maniyars and Udayars in the Tamil districts. The villages and hamlets are in the charge of Arachchies, Peace Officers and Vidanes 

Following the Uva Rebellion in 1818 and changes to the administrative divisions of the island with the creation of Districts, British Government Agents (GA) took over the duties of the Dissava (with the remaining and newly appointed Dissavas being mere honorary titles),  with Rate Mahatmaya becoming a subordinate to the local Government Agents and Assistant Government Agents. In the same way, after 1818 the position of the remaining and newly appointed  Adigar became a mere honorary title.

The Headman Commission of 1922 states that “under the existing system each village or group of small villages is placed under the supervision of minor headman known as Gam Arachchi in Kandyan areas and police vidane or police headman in low country. The positions above those headmen were Korala in Kandyan districts; Uddaiyar in Tamil districts Vidane Arachchi in districts of low country. The top rank above all officials was represented by Rate Mahatmaya,and Adigars in Kandyyan districts, Maniyagars and Vanniyars in Tamil Districts and Mudliers in southern provinces".

For purposes of general administration, the Island is divided into nine provinces and nineteen Revenue (which are also electoral) Districts. The provinces are under Government Agents, most of whom are aided by Assistant Government Agents, the latter residing at the headquarters of districts which are not the headquarters of provinces. The districts are divided into chief headmen’s divisions, of which there are 110; these contain some 613 subdivisions under superior headmen, and the subdivisions include about 4,000 villages and hamlets each under a village headman. The chief, superior and village headmen are known by different titles in the Kandyan, Low-Country Sinhalese and Tamil districts.

During the British colonial administration of Ceylon, when uniformed policing by the Ceylon Police Force in rural areas of the island was limited, the Government Agent of the Province would appoint Headmen as Peace Officers with police powers to keep the peace. "Peace Officer" includes police officers and headmen appointed by a Government Agent in writing to perform police duties.

Reforms and abolition
Following the formation of the State Council of Ceylon in 1931, one of its members, H. W. Amarasuriya, called for an inquiry into the headman system. A commission was formed made up of retired civil servants and lawyers headed by H.M. Wedderburn. The commission reported on reforming the headman system or replacing it with a transferable appointment. Based on the recommendations of the Wedderburn commission report, the government closed the native department in 1937, thus abolishing the posts of district headmen and replacing these with that of transferable District Revenue Officer (DRO). Serving headmen were given the option of early retirement on the basis of abolition of office or to continue in their jurisdiction as the DRO. The titles of Mudaliyar (Mudali - මුදලි) and Muhandiram were retained by government to be awarded as honors. This practice remained until suspension of Ceylonese honors in 1956 by S. W. R. D. Bandaranaike. The minor headman positions remained until these were replaced with the transferable post of Grama Sevaka in May 1963 as part of the public administration reforms carried out by Minister Felix Dias Bandaranaike in the Sirimavo Bandaranaike government. All serving village headman were re-designated as Grama Sevakas under the Village Headmen (Change of Designation) Act, No. 6 of 1964. The designation modeled on that of public servant was later changed to grama niladhari which translated to village leader.

Classes of headmen
The Headman Commission of 1922 states that “under the existing system each village or group of small village is placed under the supervision of minor headman known as Gam Arachchi in Kandyan areas and police vidane or police headman in low country. The positions above those headmen were Korala in Kandyan districts; Uddaiyar in Tamil districts Vidane Arachchi in districts of low country. The top rank above all officials was represented by “Rate Mahatmaya,and Adigars in Kandyyan districts, Maniyagars and Vanniyars in Tamil Districts and Mudliers in southern provinces.

Classes of headmen in the Low Country
The headmen system in the costal and low country, evolved over time under the colonial administration of the Portuguese, the Dutch and then the British.

Maha Mudaliyar – (Head Mudaliyar or මහ මුදලි)
Head of the low country native headmen and native aide-de-camp to the Governor of Ceylon.

Korale Mudaliyar (Korale Mudali – කෝරලේ මුදලි)
Korale Mudaliyar was in-charge of an area known as a Korale and had several Muhandiram's under his supervision

Muhandiram (මුහන්දිරම්)
Muhandiram had several Vidane Arachchi's under his supervision.

Vidane Arachchi (විදානෙ ආරච්චි)
Vidane Arachchi had several Vidanes under his supervision

Vidane (විදානෙ)
Vidane had a village or group of small villages placed under his administration

Classes of headmen in the Kandyan Areas

Following the Uva Rebellion in 1818 and changes to the administrative divisions of the island with the creation of Districts, British Government Agents (GA) took over the duties of the Dissava (with the remaining and newly appointed Dissavas being mere honorary titles), with Rate Mahatmaya becoming a subordinate to the local Government Agents and Assistant Government Agents. In the same way, after 1818 the position of the remaining and newly appointed Adigar (Maha Adigar or 1st Adigar) became mere honorary titles.

Adigar
Honorary appointment

Dissava
British Government Agent of the Province took over the duties of a  Dissava (with the remaining and newly appointed Dissavas being mere honorary appointments) in 1818. Rate Mahatmayas under his supervision.

Rate Mahatmaya (රටෙි මහත්තයා) 
Rate Mahatmaya had several Korale Mahatmayas under his supervision.

Korale Mahaththaya (කෝරලේ මහත්තයා) 
Korale Mahattaya was in-charge of an area known as Korale and had several Gran Arachchis / Town Arachchis under his supervision.

Town Arachchi (ටවුන් ආරච්චි) / Gan Arachchi (ගන් ආරච්චි)
Town Arachchi / Gan Arachchi had a Town / a village or group of small villages placed under his Administration

Classes of headmen in Tamil Areas
The Northern and Eastern provinces had the following classes of native headmen:

Atikar (அதிகாரி)

Vanniyar (වන්නියා) (பண்டாரத்தார்)
The Vanniyar, also spelled Vanniya had several Maniyagar under his supervision.

Maniyagar
Maniyagar had several Udayar's under his supervision.

Udayar
Udayar had several Vidane's under his supervision.

Vidane (விதானை)
Vidane had a village or group of small villages placed under his Administration.

See also
Kachcheri
Walauwa
Grama Niladhari
Kandyan Convention
Great Rebellion of 1817–18
Matale rebellion
Maldivian Annual Tribute

References

External links

 Twentieth Century Impressions of Ceylon 
 The British Colonial Library
 The Mudaliyars Explained
 Pasgama: Step into Remoteness

Defunct government positions in Sri Lanka
Transitional period of Sri Lanka
Kandyan period
British Ceylon period